Geetha Vijayan  (born 22 June 1972) is an Indian actress who appears in Malayalam movies, a few Tamil and Hindi movies. She debuted in the 1990 Malayalam comedy-thriller film In Harihar Nagar. She has since acted in more than 150 Malayalam movies and in some Tamil and Hindi films. She has also acted in about 10 Malayalam television serials and two Tamil serials.

Personal life

Geetha Vijayan is the eldest daughter of Dr. Vijayan and Sharadambal Raman. She has a younger sister, Divya. Actress Revathi is her cousin.
 
Geetha Vijayan completed her primary and high school education from Sacred Heart Convent GHSS Thrissur and then joined Kalakshetra Foundation, Chennai, where she did her graduation and postgraduation in dancing.

Filmography

Malayalam films

Hindi films

Tamil films

Television

TV series

Reality shows as a judge
 Comedy Festival (Mazhavil Manorama)
 Comedy Express (Asianet)
 Idea Star Singer (Asianet)
 Super Dancer Junior (Amrita TV)

Reality Shows as Anchor
Golden Couple (Jeevan TV)

Game shows as participant
 Flowers Oru Kodi

References

External links

21st-century Indian actresses
1972 births
Actresses in Malayalam cinema
Indian film actresses
Living people
Actresses from Thrissur
Actresses in Hindi cinema
Actresses in Malayalam television
Indian television actresses
Actresses in Tamil cinema
20th-century Indian actresses